Lola Cordova is a single-issue French graphic novel, written and drawn by Arthur Qwak, and published in April 2005.  The extremely non-linear story tells the adventures of a prostitute who is kidnapped by aliens who wish to destroy the world.

It was republished in the march 08 issue of Heavy Metal (magazine).

External links
Lola Cordova at Les éditions Casterman website (French)

French graphic novels
Prostitution in comics
Nonlinear narrative novels